Events in the year 1828 in Art.

Events
December 3 – The Musée Fabre opens in the refurbished Hôtel de Massillian in Montpellier, France.
January 1 – The Yankee magazine is founded by art critic John Neal.

Works

Thomas Cole – The Garden of Eden
John Constable – Hampstead Heath, Branch Hill Pond
William Etty
The Dawn of Love
The World Before the Flood
Caspar David Friedrich - Ships in Harbour, Evening
Sarah Goodridge – Beauty Revealed
Orest Kiprensky – Self-portrait
August Kopisch – The Crater of Vesuvius with the Eruption of 1828
Sir Thomas Lawrence – Portrait of Charles Grey, 2nd Earl Grey
James Arthur O'Connor
The Devil's Glen, Co. Wicklow, with a fisherman
A View on the Liffey
View on the Shannon, with figures in a rowing boat
Rembrandt Peale – Self-portrait
Joseph Karl Stieler – Charlotte von Hagn (for Schönheitengalerie ("Gallery of Beauties") at Nymphenburg Palace)
John Trumbull - The Capture of the Hessians at Trenton, December 26, 1776
J. M. W. Turner – Chichester Canal
Walenty Wańkowicz – Portrait of Adam Mickiewicz

Births
February 11 – Emily Mary Osborn, English painter (died 1925)
March 28 – Étienne Carjat, French caricaturist and portrait photographer (died 1906)
March 30 – François Bocion, Swiss architect and painter (died 1890)
April 1 – George Barbu Știrbei, Romanian patron of the arts (died 1925)
May 10 – James McDougal Hart, Scottish-born painter of the Hudson River School (died 1901)
May 12 – Dante Gabriel Rossetti, English Pre-Raphaelite painter and poet (died 1882)
May 21 – Rudolf Koller, Swiss painter (died 1905)
June 13 – Jules-Élie Delaunay, French academic painter (died 1891)
June 20 – John Wharlton Bunney, English Pre-Raphaelite topographical and landscape painter (died 1882)
July 9 – Adolf Schreyer, German painter (died 1899)
July 14 – Jervis McEntee, American painter of the Hudson River School (died 1891)
July 30 – Paul Gachet, French physician to artists, Impressionist art collector and amateur painter (died 1909)
November 2 – Edward Mitchell Bannister, African American Tonalist painter (died 1901)
date unknown
Pietro Pezzati, Italian painter of church murals (died 1890)
Jan Wnęk, Polish carpenter and sculptor (died 1869)

Deaths
 January 1 – Johann Samuel Arnhold, German painter in oil and water-colours, and on porcelain and enamel (born 1766)
 January 4 – Sakai Hōitsu, Japanese painter of the Rinpa school (born 1748)
 January 23 – Giuseppe Quaglio, Italian painter and stage designer (born 1747)
 February 28 – Simon Charles Miger, French engraver (born 1736)
 April 16 – Francisco Goya, Spanish painter (born 1746)
 May 8 – Christian August Lorentzen, Danish painter (born 1746)
 May 28 – Anne Seymour Damer, English sculptor (born 1749)
 July 9 – Gilbert Stuart, American painter (born 1755)
 July 15 – Jean Antoine Houdon, French neoclassical sculptor (born 1741)
 September 28 – Richard Parkes Bonington, English landscape painter (born 1802)
 November 8 – Thomas Bewick, English engraver (born 1753)
 November 17 – Franz Caucig, Slovene painter and drawer (born 1755)
 date unknown
 William Billingsley, English painter of porcelain (born 1758)
 Thomas Kerrich, English clergyman, antiquary, draughtsman and gifted amateur artist (born 1761)
 Wilhelmina Krafft, Swedish painter and portrait miniaturist (born 1778)
 Giuseppe Levati, Italian painter and designer in the Neoclassicist style (born 1739)
 John Webb, English landscape designer (born 1754)

References

 
Years of the 19th century in art
1820s in art